Océan was an 80-gun ship in the French Navy, the first ship to bear that name. She was designed by Antoine Groignard and constructed at Toulon by Joseph Véronique-Charles Chapelle. Her name Océan, subsequently reserved for the largest units of the French Navy, is evidence of the change of focus from large three-deckers into strong two-deckers.

She was Comte de la Clue's flagship at the battle of Lagos, where she ran aground in Almadora Bay and was burnt by the British.

Sources and references

Bibliography
 
 

Ships of the line of the French Navy
1756 ships
Maritime incidents in 1759